Tercera División is the third tier of the Venezuelan football league system. 

The Venezuelan second division was established in 2007.

List of champions

Titles by Team

Notes

External links
 Resolución de la FVF

4
Sports leagues established in 2007
2007 establishments in Venezuela
Vene